Robert 'Rab' Shannon (born 20 April 1966 in Bellshill) is a Scottish former footballer who played as a defender.

Playing career
Shannon, who played for a number of Scottish clubs but spent around half his career with Dundee. He also spent a season with the Newcastle Breakers in the Australian National Soccer League.

Management career
He managed East Fife between 1999 and 2000.

See also
 Dundee United FC Season 1995-96
 Dundee United FC Season 1996-97

References

External links
 

1966 births
Living people
Footballers from Bellshill
Scottish footballers
Association football defenders
Dundee F.C. players
Middlesbrough F.C. players
Dunfermline Athletic F.C. players
Motherwell F.C. players
Dundee United F.C. players
Hibernian F.C. players
East Fife F.C. players
Scottish Football League players
English Football League players
Scottish football managers
East Fife F.C. managers
National Soccer League (Australia) players
Scotland under-21 international footballers
Scottish Football League managers
Newcastle Breakers FC players
Scottish expatriate sportspeople in Australia
Scottish expatriate footballers
Expatriate soccer players in Australia